Centory may refer to
 Centaurea, a genus of flowering plants in the family Asteraceae
 Centory (group), a 1990s German Eurodance group

Disambiguation pages

de:Centory
fr:Centory